River Town can refer to:
 River Town: Two Years on the Yangtze, 2001 book by Peter Hessler
 River Town (1999 book), book written by Bonnie Geisert and illustrated by Arthur Geisert

See also
River Township, Red Lake County, Minnesota